Nelson Ombito (born 25 December 1963) is a Kenyan judoka. He competed in the men's lightweight event at the 1988 Summer Olympics.

References

1963 births
Living people
Kenyan male judoka
Olympic judoka of Kenya
Judoka at the 1988 Summer Olympics
Place of birth missing (living people)